Gail Emmanuel (born 29 August 1962) is a Trinidad and Tobago sprinter. She competed in the women's 400 metres at the 1984 Summer Olympics.

References

External links
 

1962 births
Living people
Athletes (track and field) at the 1983 Pan American Games
Athletes (track and field) at the 1984 Summer Olympics
Trinidad and Tobago female sprinters
Olympic athletes of Trinidad and Tobago
Place of birth missing (living people)
Pan American Games competitors for Trinidad and Tobago
Olympic female sprinters